West Macquarie was an electoral district of the Legislative Assembly in the Australian state of New South Wales between 1859 and 1904, in the Bathurst region, named after the Macquarie River, being the western side of the river to the south of the town of Bathurst. It was abolished in 1904 due to the re-distribution of electorates following the 1903 New South Wales referendum, which required the number of members of the Legislative Assembly to be reduced from 125 to 90. It was largely replaced by the new district of Blayney, which also absorbed parts of Hartley and The Macquarie. The rest of the district was absorbed by Yass.

Members for West Macquarie

Election results

References

Former electoral districts of New South Wales
Constituencies established in 1859
1859 establishments in Australia
Constituencies disestablished in 1904
1904 disestablishments in Australia